Henry Evans (born 6 August 1846, date of death unknown) was an Australian cricketer. He played one first-class match for Tasmania in 1868/69, and two first-class matches for Wellington in 1873/74 to 1875/76.

See also
 List of Tasmanian representative cricketers

References

External links
 

1846 births
Year of death missing
Australian cricketers
Tasmania cricketers
Wellington cricketers
Cricketers from Launceston, Tasmania